The Illustrated Sydney News was a monthly English language newspaper published in Sydney, New South Wales, Australia.

History
First published on 8 October 1853 by Walter George Mason (1820 – 12 March 1866), William Edward Vernon and Ludolf Theodore Mellin. The Illustrated Sydney News was published from 1853 to 1872. From 1872 to 1881 the title was changed to The Illustrated Sydney News and New South Wales Agriculturist and Grazier and then back to the original shorter title between 1881 and 1894.

The first edition received mixed reviews in the Sydney Morning Herald.

Edward Vernon and Ludolf Mellin sold their shares of the paper within six months of its first publication and embarked on a new publication The Goulburn Chronicle and Southern Advertiser. Vernon had previously collaborated with William Kennedy between 1846–1847 to produce The Citizen in Sydney. Mellin, was a native of Braunschweig in Germany.

Philip Holdsworth was editor from the 1880s.
Until 1888, the illustrations were wood engravings, each printed in black ink and each of which took one engraver about a week to complete. In August 1888, The Illustrated Sydney News'' became the first Australian paper to reproduce a photograph using the new half-tone process. The slow and expensive wood engraving process was obsolete.

Publishing in the NSW colony 
Most material published in the first twenty years of the New South Wales colony notified soldiers, convicts and private settlers contained "government orders" printed on a portable wooden and iron printing press and displayed or announced aloud in public places and in churches.

Digitisation
The paper has been digitised as part of the Australian Newspapers Digitisation Program project at the National Library of Australia.

A list of illustrations of maritime interest to be found in the Illustrated Sydney News has been made by the Australian National Maritime Museum.

Individual issues can be viewed online at Trove.

See also
 List of newspapers in Australia

References

External links

Other NSW newspapers from the National Library of Australia 
Press timeline: Select chronology of significant Australian press events to 2011.
The birth of the newspaper in Australia
Isaacs, Victor, Kirkpatrick, Rod and Russell, John (2004). Australian Newspaper History: A Bibliography
Isaacs, Victor; Kirkpatrick, Rod,  Illustrated Sydney News Index to Illustrations of ships, ports and places, and other items of general maritime interest 1853 to 1889 inclusive, (1990) Compiled by Vaughan Evans
Two hundred years of Sydney newspapers: A short history, Rural Press Ltd

Defunct newspapers published in Sydney
Newspapers established in 1853
1853 establishments in Australia